Unnimaya is an Indian Malayalam psychological horror thriller television series aired on Asianet from 26 August 2019 with Vidhya Vinu Mohan and  Haritha G Nair playing the lead. The show went off air by 1 November 2019. It was a planned finite series.

Plot
Nikita often gets nightmares which turn out to be true. One such nightmare has a disastrous end and involves her daughter. Will Nikitha decode her link with these dreams before they ruin her life?

Cast

Vidhya Mohan as Nikita
Haritha G Nair as Sivaganga
Baby Alia Wasim as Vedamol
Kishor as Narendran
Balan Parakkal as Ramabhadran
Kiran Raj as Musafir
Surjith Purohit as Niranjan
A.K.Anand as Sankaran
Anand Krishnan as Sanakan
Anand Narayan as Prakash Babu
Muhammed Rafi as DYSP Lijo John
Firoz as George
Ambili sunil as Sugandhi
Devan Kakkad as Moosad
Sarath Swamy 
Sumi Surendran
Jinsa mathew as Jesmi
Krishna Sharma TK as Poojari
Sudarshana Pai
Sumi Santhosh
Archana Menon

References

External links

2019 Indian television series debuts
2019 Indian television series endings
Malayalam-language television shows
Asianet (TV channel) original programming